What If It's You is the twenty-first album by American country music artist Reba McEntire. It was released on November 5, 1996, and would peak at #1 on the Billboard country chart and #15 on the Billboard 200.  It is certified 2× Multi-Platinum by the RIAA. What If It's You was the first album in which McEntire did not use session musicians; relying instead on her touring band. The album produced four singles in "The Fear of Being Alone", "How Was I to Know", "I'd Rather Ride Around with You" and "What If It's You", which respectively reached #2, #1, #2, and #15 on the Billboard country charts.

The album peaked at #1 on the Billboard Top Country Albums chart and #15 on the Billboard Top 200 Albums chart.

Track listing

Personnel
 Reba McEntire – lead and backing vocals
 Paul Hollowell – piano 
 Doug Sisemore – keyboards
 Biff Watson – acoustic guitar
 Steve Gibson – acoustic guitar (2)
 Kent Wells – electric guitars
 Terry Crisp – steel guitar
 Larry Franklin – fiddle, mandolin
 Chopper Anderson – bass guitar
 Scott Hawkins – drums, percussion
 Joe Chemay – backing vocals
 Liana Manis – backing vocals

Production
 Reba McEntire – producer 
 John Guess – producer, recording, mixing 
 Derek Bason – recording, mix assistant
 Scott Ahaus – assistant engineer
 Patrick Murphy – assistant engineer
 Marty Williams – mastering 
 Carole Ann Mobley – production coordinator 
 Cindy Owen – art direction, design 
 Mark Tucker – photography 
 Narvel Blackstock – management

Studios 
 Recorded and Mixed at Starstruck Studios (Nashville, Tennessee).
 Mastered at The Work Station (Nashville, Tennessee).

Charts

Weekly charts

Year-end charts

Singles

Certifications and sales

References

1996 albums
Reba McEntire albums
MCA Records albums